Selma is a small community in the Canadian province of Nova Scotia, located in  The Municipality of the District of East Hants in Hants County.

Acadians 

The LeJeune Family lived in Selma prior to the Acadian Exodus from the area in 1750 during Father Le Loutre's War.  According to Captain Matthew Floyer, Selma had four dwellings and a mill. The field beside the Selma Brook was named "La Pree a Breard".

Selma may have been named Village Robere as referenced by Charles Morris, which would mean that the Robert Henry Family also lived in the village. The Ile St. Jean census date of 1752 suggest that the Henry family married many of those in the Pitre family.  The Pitre Family were in the neighbouring community of Maitland, Nova Scotia.

Alternatively, however, there is evidence to suggest that Vil Robere may have been East Noel (present day Densmore Mills, Nova Scotia).

Major Small and the 84th Highland Regiment 

After the American Revolution Selma was settled by loyalists soldiers who fought for the British. Major-General John Small received the land at Selma from Malachy Salter. Oral history stated that Small built a manor house in the area which he named Selma Hall, after which the community is named.

Ship Building (1860–1885)

During the second half of the nineteenth century, shipbuilding and supporting sub-trades were the mainstay of the economy on this small and bustling hamlet.

At the mouth of Selmah Creek lay the site of three shipyards.  The largest of these was owned by Alexander A. McDougall.  From this shipyard 19 barques were built and launched.  A. A. McDougall set up the first steam timber mill replacing the man-powered saw pit at his yard.

Next to the McDougall yard was that of (David) Pratt & Cox.

Beyond the Pratt shipyard  was that of George Oxley Smith and his son, McCully Smith.  George Oxley Smith was also a Justice of the Peace sitting in judgement on various disturbances, timber contracts and other legal matters.

Ships built in Selmah (1862-1885) 

Lily 1862 
Craigdownie 1863 
Jessie 1863 
D.B.R. 1864 
Wanderer 1864 
Mary 1865 
June Ure 1866 
Scotia Queen 1867 
Bina 1868 
Maggie Brown 1869 
Minnie Graham 1870 
Maitland 1871 
Eliza Campbell 1871 
Jane Campbell 1872 
Cupid 1872 
Tranmere 1872 
Lotus 1872 
Lady Vere de Vere 1873 
Disco 1873 
Isabelle Ure 1874 
Francois Herbert 1874 
Silas Curtis 1874 
Margaret Mitchell 1875 
Norman 1876 
Margaret Craig 1878 
Ada Brown 1879 
Delhana 1880 
Minnie Brown 1881 
Chistina 1882 
Craigie Burn 1885

References

External links
 Elizabeth Frame. History of Selma, Nova Scotia (1853)
Selma on Destination Nova Scotia

Communities in Hants County, Nova Scotia
General Service Areas in Nova Scotia